The  is a city tram station located on the Shinminatokō Line in Takaoka, Toyama Prefecture, Japan. This station is unmanned.

Surrounding area
This station is located near Route 415.

Railway stations in Toyama Prefecture